The longwave transmitter Raszyn is a longwave broadcasting transmitter near Raszyn, Poland. It was built in 1949. The designer of the mast is unknown. It has been claimed that it was built of sections from radio mast of former Deutschlandsender Herzberg/Elster; however, there is no proof of this theory.

The longwave transmitter Raszyn was until the inauguration of Warsaw radio mast in Konstantynów the central longwave broadcasting of Poland.
Since 1978 from this facility during daytime a second program in the longwave range was transmitted on AM-LW (long wave)198 kHz/1,515 meters (formerly the frequency was used by Radio Parlament).
After the collapse of Warsaw radio mast in 1991 this facility was used until the inauguration of the new longwave-transmitter Solec Kujawski for transmissions of the first program of the Polish Broadcasting Service on AM-LW (longwave) 225 kHz/1,333 meters. Because it was not possible to transmit from Raszyn on both longwave frequencies of the Polish Broadcasting Company simultaneously, no transmissions on the second longwave frequency of the Polish Broadcasting Company (AM-LW 198 kHz/1515 meters) took place between 1991 and 1999.

The radio mast of the longwave transmitter Raszyn is since the collapse of the Warsaw radio mast the sixth tallest structure in Poland. On July 31, 2009, Polish Radio Parlament on has discontinued their broadcast on AM-LW (longwave) due to economical crisis, and the longwave transmitter has been turned off.

In the late 1930s works started to increase the output power to 600 kW but the works were not completed before start of the World War II. One of the masts was destroyed by the Polish Army engineers to prevent the Germans from using the station.

Trivia: for a very short time after opening their new transmitting facility in 1931 the official Polish Radio Co. announcement was 'Halo, tu Polskie Radio Raszyn' ('This is the Polish Radio Raszyn'), but because Polish pronunciation of 'Raszyn' is nearly identical to English pronunciation of 'Russian' and therefore was confusing foreign listeners, the announcement was promptly changed back to 'Halo, tu Polskie Radio Warszawa' ('This is the Polish Radio Warsaw') (source: Maciej Józef Kwiatkowski 'Tu Polskie Radio Warszawa', Warsaw 1980).

Transmitted Programmes

Radio

Digital Television MPEG 4

See also

External links
 http://emi.emitel.pl/EMITEL/obiekty.aspx?obiekt=DODR_E1N
 
 http://www.skyscraperpage.com/diagrams/?b41846
 http://www.przegubowiec.com/foto/wawa/9002-lazy2.JPG
 http://www.ukf.pl/index.php/topic,178.0.html
 Google Maps
 http://radiopolska.pl/wykaz/pokaz_lokalizacja.php?pid=611
 AM broadcasting (for more information on AM broadcasting)

Infrastructure completed in 1949
Radio masts and towers in Poland
Pruszków County
Buildings and structures in Masovian Voivodeship
1949 establishments in Poland